Stay Alive is a 2006 American supernatural horror film directed by William Brent Bell, who co-wrote it with Matthew Peterman. The film was produced by Joseph McGinty Nichol, and released on March 24, 2006 in the United States.
It was the first film released by Hollywood Pictures after five years of inactivity.

Plot 
After playing a video game titled Stay Alive, Loomis Crowley, his roommate Rex, and Rex's girlfriend Sarah are killed the same way as their characters were killed in the game.

At Loomis' funeral, his friend Hutch meets Abigail – a friend of Sarah – and receives some of Loomis' possessions, including Stay Alive. Hutch, his girlfriend October, and her brother Phineus decide to play the game as a group. They are joined by Abigail and another friend, Swink, while Hutch's boss Miller plays online from his office.

The game is set in a derelict mansion on Gerouge Plantation, but it only starts when the six players recite "The Prayer of Elizabeth," a request for "all who resist" to perish so that their blood can keep the Countess Elizabeth Bathory young. The players fight through a cemetery of evil ghost children, heading toward a mausoleum and tower. Miller is directed by the game to pick up a rose. October, a reader of occult literature, explains that undead spirits cannot move across wild roses. Separated from the others, Miller throws the rose to dispel the spirits of undead girls. Since he is now out of roses, a woman in a red dress, the Countess, kills Miller's character. Minutes later, the Countess appears in Miller's office and kills him by stabbing him with conjoined scissor blades like the ones in the game.

Two detectives, Thibodeaux and King, question Hutch about the homicides. Hutch realizes that Loomis and Miller played Stay Alive right before they died, and that they died the same way as their game characters did. October researches Bathory and learns she would drain young women of blood, bathing in it to maintain her youth. Her weakness was mirrors because she could not stand to see herself growing old. Phineus decides to play alone, and despite quitting the game before his character can die, he is killed in real life when he is run over by a horse-drawn carriage. The survivors agree to stop playing Stay Alive. However, Detective King ignores Swink's warning and plays until his character dies. King is then killed in his car.

Hutch and Abigail search Loomis' house and learn of the game developer's location: the real Gerouge Plantation. October has discovered that the real Countess Bathory was locked in the tower of her estate as punishment for her gruesome acts and vowed to return one day for revenge, which she is now able to do, as The Prayer of Elizabeth has resurrected her. The Countess can only be killed by driving three nails into her body to trap her soul. October sees the Countess in real life and tries to kill her but realizes that she is a ghost. She has her throat slit by the Countess. The three survivors realize that once the game has begun, it can play by itself. Swink stays in a van and plays the game on his laptop to distract Bathory, while Hutch and Abigail search Gerouge Plantation.

The Countess begins cheating, arriving in her carriage to kill Swink in real life, even though his character is alive. Swink decides to run for it until he falls over into a bush of roses. Hutch and Abigail return to the van to find Swink's character dead. They take the laptop and some wild roses, which they drop to deter undead children as they move toward the tower. They become separated and Hutch performs the ritual on Bathory's body alone. Bathory's phantom attacks Abigail. At the top of the tower, Hutch finds the preserved body of Elizabeth Bathory and hammers three nails into it, after which the spirit disappears. Bathory's body reanimates; recalling that the Countess hates mirrors, Hutch uses the reflective laptop to repel her before setting the room ablaze. Swink, still alive due to the rose bush, bursts in with Abigail and rescues Hutch. As Bathory's body burns, the three leave the tower.

Meanwhile, the gaming store is now selling copies of Stay Alive. Intrigued, a worker puts a copy in a PlayStation 2. As the intro to the game begins, the group reciting Elizabeth Bathory's prayer is heard as the game zooms to Bathory, staring out her window.

Cast

Box office 
Stay Alive was released in U.S. theaters on March 24, 2006. The film opened at #3 in the U.S. box office with $10.7 million that first weekend. It ultimately grossed a total of $23.08 million in the United States. The movie grossed a total of over $27.1 million worldwide.

Critical reception 
Stay Alive received negative critical reviews. Metacritic reported the film had an average score of 24 out of 100 based on 17 reviews. Rotten Tomatoes holds this film with a 10% rating based on 59 reviews, with an average rating of 3.20/10. The site's critics consensus states: "A by-the-numbers teen horror flick, Stay Alive fails to exploit its premise for any real scares."

Writing for Newsday, John Anderson commented that "'Stay Alive' spends a lot of time inside the video game system, and what will terrify the audience very early on is the realization that there's better acting in the video game than on the big screen." Meanwhile, writing for Variety, Anderson concluded: "Seldom is there anything close to real passion or panic on display here from cast members." Gregory Kirschling of Entertainment Weekly gave the film a D− and commented, "this dopey movie keeps flouting its own rules, so that one character who dies in the game gets to live, while poor suckers get offed for real even though we never saw their Game Overs." Entertainment Weekly gave the "Unrated Director's Cut" version a C+.

Retrospective reception
Despite its initial negative reception, Stay Alive has been regarded by some in the years since as a cult classic horror movie.

Home video release 
The DVD was released in the United States on September 19, 2006. It was made available in an unrated edition (100 minutes) and a "PG-13" edition (85 minutes). The 15 minutes of new unrated footage include a new character and subplot. The unrated edition features more adult material. As of December 2011, the total amount of DVD units sold is 874,827, bringing in $13,636,869 in revenue.

Potential sequel
In August 2022, Bell revealed that developments for a potential sequel film are ongoing. The filmmaker stated that creatives "are trying very hard to make another one".

See also 
 List of ghost films
 Countess Dracula (1971), film about Elizabeth Bathory
 Eternal (2005), another film inspired by Bathory
 Survival horror
 Techno-horror

References

External links 

 
 
 
 
 

2006 films
American supernatural horror films
2000s English-language films
American films with live action and animation
American ghost films
American teen horror films
Films about video games
Hollywood Pictures films
Spyglass Entertainment films
Universal Pictures films
2006 horror films
Wonderland Sound and Vision films
Films directed by William Brent Bell
Films scored by John Frizzell (composer)
Cultural depictions of Elizabeth Báthory
2000s supernatural horror films
2000s American films